The 1977 Long Beach State 49ers football team represented California State University, Long Beach during the 1977 NCAA Division I football season.

Cal State Long Beach competed in the Pacific Coast Athletic Association. The team was led by first year head coach Dave Currey, and played the majority of their home games at Anaheim Stadium in Anaheim, California. One game was still played at Veterans Stadium adjacent to the campus of Long Beach City College in Long Beach, California. They finished the season with a record of four wins, six losses (4–6, 1–3 PCAA).

Schedule

Team players in the NFL
The following were selected in the 1978 NFL Draft.

Notes

References

Long Beach State
Long Beach State 49ers football seasons
Long Beach State 49ers football